1001 Crystal Mazes Collection is a logic puzzle game developed by Teyon for the Nintendo DSiWare. It was available in the Nintendo DSi Shop for 500 Nintendo DSi Points.

Gameplay

1001 Crystal Mazes Collection is a jewel logic game in which a player pushes colorful crystals around a maze to their target destinations. The game gets more challenging with each level.

The player can choose from 1001 mazes. There is a coin with an image of a girl or a boy that shows a player's current position and can be moved using both a directional pad and a stylus (by touching arrows visible on the touchscreen). The player can push a crystal in front of them when they move. Only one element can be moved at a time and the positions of the walls cannot be changed. When a crystal is pushed in a corner or two of them are aligned next to each other alongside a wall, they can no longer be moved which causes the player to lose.

The number of crystals visible on the screen is different in each maze. The simplest ones contain 3-4 elements, while in the most difficult mazes players have to move over 30 crystals.

Reception
1001 Crystal Mazes Collection received an overall score of 7/10 from IGN and a four out of ten stars from Nintendo Life.

See also
 Sokoban
 Robot Rescue
 Ball Fighter
 Super Swap
 101 Shark Pets

References

External links
 1001 Crystal Mazes Collection's site at Teyon.com 

2010 video games
DSiWare games
Nintendo DS-only games
Nintendo DS games
Video games developed in Poland

Single-player video games
Teyon games